Fritz Siegenthaler (born 18 March 1929) is a Swiss former cyclist. He competed in the men's sprint and the tandem events at the 1952 Summer Olympics.

References

External links
 

1929 births
Possibly living people
Swiss male cyclists
Olympic cyclists of Switzerland
Cyclists at the 1952 Summer Olympics